Gateshead Thunder was a professional rugby league club founded in 1999 in Gateshead, Tyne and Wear, England, which competed in the 1999 Super League but then merged with Hull Sharks after only one season. To retain rugby league in Gateshead, a new Gateshead Thunder club (now Newcastle Thunder) played in Gateshead from 2001 until 2014.

History
The club was formed by Kath Hetherington and Shane Richardson at an initial cost of £500,000 with sponsors Northern Electric & Gas reportedly investing a similar amount "over three years." 

Hetherington previously founded Sheffield Eagles with her husband Gary Hetherington. After selling her shares in Sheffield Eagles in 1996, Hetherington invested in the new club citing the potential for rugby league expansion in the North East.

In 1998, Gateshead was officially granted a franchise in the Super League ahead of bids from Swansea, Northampton, and Cardiff. The club was named Gateshead Thunder, the name chosen in a contest, with Shaun McRae as head coach. The team played at Gateshead International Stadium, which they called the Thunderdome.

Fan attendance in the early part of the season was poor but rose to 3,895 by the season's end. Gateshead Thunder finished in sixth position, just two points outside the playoff places. They had defeated St. Helens home and away, as well as beating Wigan Warriors in the 'on the road' fixture at Tynecastle, Edinburgh. Matt Daylight was the joint leading try scorer in Super League IV and winger Ian Herron was one of the leading goal-kickers in the league.

During their sole season in Super League in 1999, the Thunder claimed to have lost £700,000, so on 15 November 1999, the board announced their intention to merge the Thunder with the Hull Sharks, for which they were paid £1.25 million by Super League Europe. The Association of Premiership Clubs blocked attempts for the newly merged company to enter a separate Hull-based team in the Northern Ford Premiership and so the new club would be called 'Hull FC' and play all their home games in Hull itself. The 'merger' has since been accepted to be a simple takeover of Thunder by Hull F.C. to allow them to retain their Super League status.

Fans of the original Gateshead club who were opposed to the merger established Thunderstorm, a grassroots organization to keep the clubs separate. Although this ultimately proved to be unsuccessful, the degree of local fan support resulted in the formation of a new Gateshead Thunder club. The new Gateshead Thunder was accepted to play in the Northern Ford Premiership for the 2001 season.

Results

Season summary

1999 season

Coach
 Shaun McRae

Players

 Richard Allwood
 Sean Allwood
 Deon Bird
 Brian Carney
 Garreth Carvell
 Steve Collins
 Ben Sammut
 Craig Simon
 Stuart Singleton
 Will Robinson
 Matthew Daylight
 Luke Felsch
 Brett Green
 Tony Grimaldi
 Brett Grogan
 Ian Herron
 Andrew Hick
 Russell Hugill
 Mick Jenkins
 Danny Lee
 Adam Maher
 David Maiden
 Danny McAllister
 Steve O'Neill
 Willie Peters
 Kerrod Walters
 Craig Wilson

References

1999 establishments in England
Defunct rugby league teams in England
Gateshead Thunder
Rugby clubs established in 1999
Rugby league teams in Tyne and Wear
Super League teams
Sport in Gateshead